Ivan Fyodorovich Tkachev (6 August 1896 – 29 July 1938) was a Soviet komkor (corps commander). He was born in present-day Volgograd (called Stalingrad at the time of his death). He fought in the civil war on the side of the Bolsheviks against the White movement. He was a recipient of the Order of the Red Banner. During the Great Purge, he was arrested on 29 January 1938 and later executed. He was buried in Moscow. After the death of Joseph Stalin, he was rehabilitated on 8 February 1956.

References 
 

1896 births
1938 deaths
People of the Russian Civil War
Soviet komkors
Recipients of the Order of the Red Banner
Great Purge victims from Russia
People executed by the Soviet Union
Soviet rehabilitations
Frunze Military Academy alumni